Carretera Norte, officially known as Kennedy Boulevard, is the main thoroughfare connecting the city of Managua to points east and west of the city. Its western end terminates at the Augusto C. Sandino International Airport, and the road continues east to the Pista Pedro Joaquin Chamorro.

External links 
 Street Maps Furnished by the Office of the Mayor.

Managua
Roads in Nicaragua